Groblersbrug (known as Grobler's Bridge in English) is a border crossing between South Africa and Botswana on the Limpopo River in Limpopo. On the Botswana side, the border post is known as Martin's Drift.

References

Botswana–South Africa border crossings